Thinadhoo (Dhivehi: ތިނަދޫ) is one of the inhabited islands of Vaavu Atoll in the Maldives.

The island is widely used for tourism and guest house business is rapidly increasing in the island.

Geography

Demography
In 2003, the island was described as the least populated of the inhabited islands in the atoll.

Healthcare
Thinadhoo has a pharmacy.

References

Populated places in the Maldives
Islands of the Maldives